The Aquatic Palace is a sporting venue in Baku, Azerbaijan, which is fully compliant with the requirements of the International Swimming Federation (FINA). The Palace hosted the Baku 2015 European Games and Baku 2017 4th Islamic Solidarity Games.

The Aquatic Palace has three swimming pools. One pool is an Olympic-size swimming pool and was designed for different types of competitions at local and international levels. The length of the pool for diving is 25 meters in height and 20 meters in width and has a five-stage platform for high board diving from a height of 3, 5, 7, 5 and 10 meters. 6,000-10,000 spectators can watch sports competitions, concerts at the palace.

The palace also has sectors for VIP, media and the disabled. In one part of the roof of the building used special panoramic glass panels which can convert solar energy into electricity. The generated electricity will be used for energy supply to some sections of the Palace.

References

External links

Sports venues in Baku
Swimming venues in Azerbaijan
Swimming in Azerbaijan
2015 European Games venues